This is a list of mines in Saskatchewan, Canada. 

Saskatchewan